Mark Terrell Washington II (born August 20, 1985) is a former American football linebacker. He played college football at Texas State.

Early life and college career
Washington was born in Harbor City, California. His father, also named Mark Washington, was a defensive end at the University of Colorado Boulder. Growing up in Long Beach, Washington graduated from Long Beach Polytechnic High School in 2003. As a senior, Washington was a first-team all-state honor on defense in 2002. He helped Long Beach Poly win the CIF Southern Section Division I title in 2001.

USA Today ranked Washington the no. 3 linebacker in the nation, and Scout.com rated Washington three stars out of five. In 2003, Washington began his college football career at Arizona State under head coach Dirk Koetter. Playing in eight games, Washington had seven tackles and a sack. After his freshman season, Washington left the football team to focus on academics.

In the spring of 2006, Washington transferred to Texas State, then a Division I-AA program coached by David Bailiff. Starting nine games at defensive tackles out of 11 games played in 2006, Washington had 29 tackles, including 7.5 tackles for loss and 3.5 sacks, and one sack.

Professional career
On July 4, 2007, Washington was declared eligible for the 2007 NFL Supplemental Draft. The San Francisco 49ers signed Washington as an undrafted free agent on July 18, 2007. Following the preseason, Washington was waived on September 1 but signed with the 49ers practice squad three days later.

On December 5, 2007, Washington signed with Miami Dolphins to the active roster. He played in the Dolphins' final three games of the season and had one tackle. The Dolphins released Washington on April 24, 2008.

Washington signed again with the 49ers on March 16, 2009 and was cut after the preseason on September 5. On December 11, 2009, Washington signed with the Arizona Cardinals and was placed on the practice squad. He then signed a futures contract with the Cardinals on January 18, 2010. Following an injury, Washington was waived on September 3. On July 31, 2011, Washington signed with the Minnesota Vikings. He was released nearly a month later on August 26.

In 2015, Washington was outside linebackers coach at Humboldt State. The 2015 Humboldt State team went 10–2 with a second round appearance in the NCAA Division II playoffs.

References

External links
Texas State Bobcats bio

1985 births
Living people
Sportspeople from Long Beach, California
Players of American football from Long Beach, California
American football linebackers
Arizona State Sun Devils football players
Texas State Bobcats football players
San Francisco 49ers players
Miami Dolphins players
Arizona Cardinals players
Minnesota Vikings players
Humboldt State Lumberjacks football coaches